The Central Geneva Historic District is a set of 102 buildings and structures in Geneva, Illinois. Of those, 68 contribute to the district's historical integrity. The district is representative of southern Geneva, south of Illinois Route 38. Among the noted buildings is the Kane County Courthouse and the Frank Lloyd Wright-designed P. D. Hoyt House. The district was added to the National Register of Historic Places in 1979, and was enlarged in 2017.

History
The Central Geneva Historic District principally consists of land from the original platted settlement, now the southern half of the town. It is primarily residential, but does have a commercial sector lining W. State Street (Illinois Route 38). Among the public buildings are a public library, city hall, and county courthouse. The only other major road intersecting the district is S. First Street (Illinois Route 31). Most houses are two-story frame residences built between 1840 and 1900, principally from a vernacular style. Geneva's later identification as a scenic shopping area encouraged the city to invest in the restoration of several structures. The district was added to the National Register of Historic Places on September 10, 1979.

Notable properties

The nomination form for the historic district singles out several properties that are particularly representative of mid- to late- 19th century architectural styles
Unitarian Church, built in 1843, Greek Revival
Loveday House, built c. 1869, Gothic Revival
Augustus Herrington House, built c. 1851, Italianate
Moore House #2, built in 1864, Italianate
Plato House, built in 1857, Italianate
Charles B. Wells House, built in 1850, Neoclassical
George Patten House, built in 1857, Federal Revival
Isaac Wilson House #1, built c. 1852, Federal Revival
P. D. Hoyt House, built in 1906, designed by Frank Lloyd Wright, Prairie School
Eben Conant House, built c. 1844, vernacular
Walter House, built c. 1855, vernacular
Benjamin Wilson house, built c. 1848

References

Geneva, Illinois
National Register of Historic Places in Kane County, Illinois
Gothic Revival architecture in Illinois
Greek Revival architecture in Illinois
Italianate architecture in Illinois
Historic districts on the National Register of Historic Places in Illinois
Geography of Kane County, Illinois
Tourist attractions in Kane County, Illinois